Petrovsk may refer to:

Petrovsk, Saratov Oblast, a town in Saratov Oblast, Russia, on the Medveditsa River
Petrovsk (inhabited locality), several places in Russia
Petrovsk (air base), an air base in Saratov Oblast, Russia
Petrovsk-Port, name of the city of Makhachkala in the Republic of Dagestan, Russia, in 1857–1921

See also
Petrovsky (disambiguation)
Petrovsk-Zabaykalsky (disambiguation)
Novopetrovsk (disambiguation)